The Detroit–Superior Bridge (officially known as the Veterans Memorial Bridge) is a  through arch bridge over the Cuyahoga River in Cleveland, Ohio. The bridge links Detroit Avenue on Cleveland's west side and Superior Avenue on Cleveland's east side, terminating west of Public Square. Construction by the King Bridge Company began in 1914 and completed in 1918, at a cost of $5.4 million. It was the first fixed high level bridge in Cleveland, and the third high-level bridge above the Cuyahoga (the first was the Old Superior Viaduct and the second the Central Viaduct, also built by the King Company). At the time of its completion, the bridge was the largest steel and concrete reinforced bridge in the world.

Specifications

The high level bridge starts on the east at the center line of West 9th Street and Superior, and extends across the Cuyahoga Valley to the junction of West 25th Street and Detroit Avenue. The total cost, including the land and a right of way, was $5,407,000, split as $1,687,200 was for land and $3,719,800 for the superstructure.

While the bridge's upper level is for road traffic, the lower level was intended for streetcars. It was built with four sets of these tracks, leaving room for two more, if needed.

The structure includes 12 concrete arches and one steel span. The steel span cost $646,747. Each end of the structure has underground streetcar stations for the trams that operated on the lower deck.

Subway
The Detroit–Superior subway was an underground transit system that operated between 1917 until its closure January 24, 1954.  The line served riders between Cleveland's west side and downtown.  The system had two stations: West 25th (four platforms) and West 9th (two platforms), which included restrooms.  The line ran on the lower level of the Detroit–Superior Bridge.

Gallery

Modifications
Due to the closure of the streetcar operations, the subway level became unused. In November 1955, ramps to the lower level were closed. The Detroit–Superior Bridge remained a bottleneck during rush hour. A two-year renovation completed in May 1969 added two traffic lanes by narrowing existing sidewalks from 15 to 5 feet and cantilevering the new lanes outside the central arch.

On November 11, 1989 (Veterans Day), the bridge was renamed the Veterans Memorial Bridge. It was added to the National Register of Historic Places on January 18, 1974.

In 2003, Cuyahoga County Commissioners approved the conversion of the two outside traffic lanes for pedestrian and bicycle use.
The lower level and subway station are opened to the public for tours a few times per year, typically around Memorial Day, Labor Day, and for the Cleveland Ingenuity Festival. Self-guided tours are free of charge.

See also

List of bridges documented by the Historic American Engineering Record in Ohio
Hope Memorial Bridge
List of crossings of the Cuyahoga River
Cincinnati Subway
Rochester subway

References

External links

Detroit-Superior Bridge at Bridges & Tunnels
Detroit-Superior High Level Bridge at Bridges of Cleveland

Bridges completed in 1917
Bridges in Cleveland
Historic American Engineering Record in Ohio
Road bridges on the National Register of Historic Places in Ohio
Railroad bridges on the National Register of Historic Places in Ohio
National Register of Historic Places in Cleveland, Ohio
Road-rail bridges in the United States
King Bridge Company
Bridges over the Cuyahoga River
Railroad bridges in Ohio
U.S. Route 6
U.S. Route 20
U.S. Route 42
Bridges of the United States Numbered Highway System
1918 establishments in Ohio
Steel bridges in the United States
Concrete bridges in the United States
Through arch bridges in the United States